Salatut elämät ("Secret Lives", literally "Concealed Lives") is a Finnish television soap opera that premiered on MTV3 on 25 January 1999. The series' storylines follow the daily lives of several families who live in the same apartment block in Helsinki. The series primarily centres on the residents of Pihlajakatu and its neighbouring areas. Only six of the original twenty characters Ismo (Esko Kovero), Kalle (Pete Lattu), Ulla (Maija-Liisa Peuhu), Aki (Sami Uotila), Kari (Tommi Taurula) and Elina (Inna Tähkänen, originally played by Sanna Luostarinen) still remain in the series, and most of the series' current characters have made their debuts in 2014 or later. Ismo is the only character who has never left the series.

During the series' 23-year run, over 4,000 episodes have been aired, making it the longest running drama in television in the Nordics. On 12 June 2017, it was announced that Salatut elämät will be on the air until the summer 2023 making the series the longest-lasting drama series of all time in Finland.

MTV3 also airs reruns of the series every weekend (Monday-Wednesday episodes on Saturday, Thursday-Friday episodes on Sunday). In the summer, the channel airs reruns of the series; in the summer of 2014, episodes from the season 2009–2010 were aired.

Eight web spin-off series have been made; Romeo & Rafael Desperados in 2008, Lillukanvarsia in 2010–2011, Tuuliranta in 2011–2012, Young Man Cash Man in 2013, Young Girl, Dream Girl in 2014, Satula in 2015, Bikineitä ja timantteja (or in English known as Bikinis and Diamonds) in 2016 and Pihlajakadun tuhmat tädit in 2016–2017.

On 5 December 2012, the first Salatut elämät movie was released. The teen thriller movie Nightmare – Painajainen merellä ("Nightmare – Nightmare at Sea") was one of the most watched Finnish films of 2012. The film was directed by Marko Äijö and the main characters are Peppi (Sara Säkkinen), Heidi (Venla Savikuja), Jiri (Mikko Parikka), Joonatan (Markku Pulli), Miro (Patrik Borodavkin), Oona (Sara Lohiniva) and Sampo (Sampsa Tuomala). Nightmare - Painajainen merellä also won the Jussi Award in the category Public Favorite. A second film, called Nightmare 2 was released in December 2014.

The show's romantic storyline between Elias (Petteri Paavola) and Lari (Ronny Röslöf), nicknamed "Larias", initially proved very popular on YouTube. A fan account featured clips of the two gay characters. The production company decided not to intervene because they saw it as good publicity.

Another LGBT couple Mira Jokinen & Viola Helenius (now having Viola's grandmothers maiden name,  Angervuo as their surname) have also become popular on YouTube. "Miola" became a phenomenon abroad after a Finnish fan started uploading their story with English subtitles on Youtube series. Mira and Viola even got married, being the first same-sex couple to be married in a Finnsh soap.

The starting position of the series 
At the beginning of the series, at the request of caretaker Seppo Taalasmaa (Jarmo Koski) and his wife Ulla (Maija-Liisa Peuhu), the police have come to investigate why Tyyne Puustinen does not open the door. She is found dead in her apartment and police begin to find out the cause of death. The couple later tells about their event to their daughter Elina Taalasmaa (Sanna Luostarinen).

Aki Nikkinen (Sami Uotila) and Markus Ekholm (Andrei Sandberg) have been looking for a suitable retail space for their café for a long time and will eventually find a suitable one. Katja Vainio (Anu Koskinen) promises to be an interior designer. Katja's sister and roommate Jenni (Anu Palevaara) has brought a gentleman Toni Veijalainen (Kristo Salminen) to her home. Jenni receives a letter stating that she has been expelled from school due to continued absences. At the same time, the subsidies also run out, so Jenni asks Toni to be their subtenant.

Jukka Salin (Jouko Keskinen) and his new wife Hanna (Tarja Omenainen) return home from the Canary Islands. At home, they are received by Aleksi (Tuomas Kytömäki), who has just left the army, the middle child of the family Saku (Jasper Pääkkönen) and the family pit Silja (Jonna Keskinen). Hanna and Jukka reveal to the children that they got married during the trip. Saku and Aleksi are happy about Hanna's move to them, but Silja doesn't take the news well, and it doesn't help that Silja hears that Aleksi knew about her marriage intentions.

Next door to Salin family lives Ismo Laitela (Esko Kovero), who is the widow of two teenage children, Miia (Venla Saartamo) and Kalle (Pete Lattu). Ismo works as a retailer in a kiosk-like store called Ismon Valinta ("Ismo's Choice"). Lawyer Laura Kiviranta (Piitu Uski) lives alone as a sworn single.

Themes
The series has dealt with a wider range of subjects such as abortion, drug abuse, alcoholism, homosexuality, incest, animal rights, rape, religious fanaticism, gambling addiction, teenage pregnancy, domestic violence, cancer, eating disorder, school bullying, narcissistic personality disorder and its effects to the family, the search of biological parents, stealing and racism; many episodes involving these themes have caused public debate.

An exceptionally widespread controversy was started by the season finale aired on 1 June 2009. In the episode, a pregnant woman, Paula Sievinen (Johanna Nurmimaa), was seemingly buried alive and a café exploded during a wedding celebration, which implied death of many main characters. Many, including Finland's Minister of Communications Suvi Lindén, questioned the show's suitability for school children. FICORA (Finnish Communications Regulatory Authority) decided later that the episode was not suitable for children under the age of 11, but the show's programming slot was late enough to meet the regulations. In 2013, the original main character Jenni Vainio played by Anu Palevaara, was shot on front of the main house, which caused a lot of talk among the fans of the series. Jenni left the series after a 14-year presence. However, producer Marko Äijö said that the biggest sensation of the series was in the early days, when Kalle Laitela, played by Pete Lattu, kissed another man. At that time, the channel MTV3 received over 40 meters of fax about the kiss.

During the series' entire run in Finland, a 30-minute episode has aired every weekday in an early-evening slot at 7:30 pm. A new season usually premieres in either late August or early September and concludes by the beginning of June. Normally, the series is on a hiatus during the Christmas holidays, approximately 3 or 4 weeks. The series' episodes are also available online at the website https://www.mtv.fi/ for 30 days after their original airing.

Settings
Salatut elämät's main focus is the fictional street Pihlajakatu ("Rowan Street"), located in Ullanlinna, Helsinki. Other locations include a high school, a hospital, Café Moose and an inn, Amanda, which contains the hotel, and a restaurant. It had also a day spa from 2009 to 2014, and a gym from 2010 to 2017. Former "main café" was Kentauri which, however, exploded during a wedding celebration in the season finale of the 11th season.

All of the houses and other locations featured in the show are filmed at the FremantleMedia studio in Konala, Helsinki. In real life, Pihlajakatu is Huvilakatu, which is located in Ullanlinna, Helsinki. Salatut elämät has also filmed scenes in Tampere and in Lapland. A few episodes have also been filmed in the Canary Islands, Lithuania, London and Copenhagen.

Theme song
The original theme song was called Tunteisiin and performed by Anna Hanski but in 2001, the theme was changed to a version performed by Jore Marjaranta. In 2004, the theme song was replaced by an electronic version of the theme music. In 2014, the theme song was switched back to the original one, first heard on 1999. In 2019, the series got completely new theme song again.

Television ratings
Since its first episode aired in January 1999, it has been one of the most popular TV shows in Finland, regularly attracting around a million viewers (1/5 of Finland's population). At the moment Salatut elämät is the highest-rated drama series in Finland, although its viewership has declined during the past few years.

Present cast and characters

Regular cast members

Recurring cast members

Notes
 Kari Taalasmaa was played by Henri Halkola, instead of Tommi Taurula, during few episodes on the 11th season, because Taurula was temporarily at sick leave.
 Gunnar Mustavaara was first played by Antti Seppä from 2016 to 2017. Raimo Grönberg took over the role in November 2017, due to Seppä's retirement.
 Viola Angervuo (formerly Helenius) was first briefly played in 2015 to 2016 by Annalisa Tyrväinen. Tyrväinen was replaced by Vivi Wahlström in November 2016.
 Aino Kaukovaara first appeared in the series from 2008 to 2010 as child and was played by Janna Ilmanen, but when the character returned to the film and spin-off-series as adult in 2014 and 2015 together with series in 2018. Ilmanen has been replaced by Jasmin Voutilainen. The character was played by Jessica Öystilä during few episodes on the 23rd season, due to Voutilainen's sick leave. The character has also been played by Laura Allonen, due to Voutilainen's sick leave again. According to  Iltalehti Voutilainen has died  . Character is currently played by Tiia Weckström.
 Nella Tamminen was played by Sonja Kasurinen from 2014 to 2018, but got replaced by Emma Nopanen.
 Elina Taalasmaa was first played by Sanna Luostarinen from 1999 to 2008. When the character returned in April 2020, the role was taken over by Inna Tähkänen, due to Luostarinen's retirement from acting.

Former cast and characters

Last appeared in 2022

Last appeared in 2021

Last appeared in 2020

Last appeared in 2019

Last appeared in 2018

Last appeared in 2017

Last appeared in 2016

Last appeared in 2015

Last appeared in 2014

Last appeared in 2013

Last appeared in 2012

Last appeared in 2011

Last appeared in 2010

Last appeared in 2009

Last appeared in 2008

Last appeared in 2007

Last appeared in 2006

Last appeared in 2005

Last appeared in 2004

Last appeared in 2003

Last appeared in 2002

Last appeared in 2001

Last appeared in 2000

Last appeared in 1999

Books based on the series
Miia ja Saku (2000) (Miia and Saku)
Kallen inttivuosi (2001) (Kalle in the army)
Siljan Jenkkivuosi (2001) (Silja in America)
Aamun uudet kuviot (2001) (Aamu's new plans)
Saku ja suuri suru (2002) (Saku and the great grief)
Teemun tarina (2002) (Teemu's story)
Aamu, Inka ja ihana Ilari (2003) (Aamu, Inka and lovely Ilari)
Ken ja isosiskon viimeinen kesä (2003) (Ken and big sister's last summer)
Ami ja ensirakkaus (2004) (Ami's first love)
Annika ja Amerikan unelma (2005) (Annika and the American Dream)
Ken ja Sauli kaukana kotoa (2006) (Ken and Sauli far away from home)
Ossi ja lumikuningatar (2007) (Ossi and the Snow Queen)
Romeo ja onnentähti (2008) (Romeo and the lucky star)
Sofia ja salaisuuksien kevät (2008) (Sofia and the spring of secrets)
Salla ja haaveiden kaupunki (2009) (Salla and the city of dreams)

See also
 Kotikatu

References

External links
 Official homepage of Salatut elämät (in Finnish)
 

Finnish television soap operas
1999 Finnish television series debuts
Finnish drama television series
Television series by Fremantle (company)
MTV3 original programming